The Hundred of Woolundunga is a cadastral unit of hundred in South Australia spanning Mount Brown Conservation Park and including the localities of Woolundunga and Saltia. It is one of the 14 hundreds of the County of Frome close to the northeast coast of Spencer Gulf.

See also 
 Lands administrative divisions of South Australia

References 

Woolundunga
1875 establishments in Australia